John DeBella is an American DJ in Philadelphia, Pennsylvania on 102.9 WMGK-FM. He was born in Queens, New York.

Career
Before arriving in Philadelphia, DeBella did a stint at WLIR Garden City.  In the early 1980s he hosted The DeBella Travesty and helped to introduce the Dare to be Different new wave format on WLIR.  During that time he befriended singer Joan Jett and received a gold record for his efforts in promoting Jett's chart-topping hit "I Love Rock and Roll".

He became famous in Philadelphia as part of WMMR's morning zoo, along with former WLIR co-alumnus Mark "The Shark" Drucker.  He was number one in the morning ratings through most of the 1980s and was a popular figure in the city of Philadelphia before being overtaken by The Howard Stern Show. After WMMR dropped DeBella, Stern made sure he worked at exactly the same station as himself. Every year he would host the "DeBella DeBall," which was held on December 7, the date was emphasized in promos with Franklin Delano Roosevelt saying "a date which will live in infamy." DeBella's favorite musician was Peter Gabriel and he enjoyed discussing Gabriel's many hits on the air. Throughout the mid 1980s, DeBella did on-air promos for the morning and afternoon cartoon blocks on WTAF Channel 29.

In 2002, he returned to radio hosting, working with WMGK. His show runs from 6–9 am. The show features cohosts Dave Gibson and Steve Vassalotti and the goofy antics of the three. The show is not only a talk format but also plays many classic rock songs throughout the morning. Included are contests and games that vary, and a carnival chance wheel for random song play, some submitted by listeners. Appearances by guest comedians and musicians are frequent. The show almost always closes with the song "Always Look on the Bright Side of Life" by Eric Idle of Monty Python fame. "Always Look on the Bright Side of Life," with "Bright Side" call-in comments by listeners, was a staple ending of his WMMR show, and again at WMGK. DeBella then signs off his broadcast with "Have a great day, Philadelphia. Don't take any crap from anybody."

Community activism
Every spring, DeBella sponsors an annual Dog-Walk in Green Lane, Pennsylvania, Park, in the nearby Montgomery County suburbs. He also heads the annual "MGK Turkey Drop," with CityTeam Philadelphia, held every year two days before Thanksgiving. Listeners are encouraged to drop off turkeys or cash donations to a number of pre-advertised drop-off points. In 2020, the event collected over 12,000 turkeys. On June 19, 2020 he hosted the 14th annual Veterans Radiothon that benefits the Philadelphia Veterans Multi-Service Center. Since 2007, John DeBella has raised over $2,000,000 for the VMC, $157,726 in the 2021 VMC drive. One on-air donation of $10,000 was made by rocker Rod Stewart in 2014.

References

American radio DJs
Radio personalities from Philadelphia
Hofstra University alumni
1951 births
Living people
People from Queens, New York